Dera Ismail Khan Subdivision formerly Frontier Region Dera Ismail Khan is a subdivision in Khyber Pakhtunkhwa province of Pakistan. The region is named after Dera Ismail Khan District which lies to the east and also borders South Waziristan to the north, Dera Ghazi Khan and Musa Khel to the south and Zhob to the west. It is administered by the district coordination officer (DCO) of Dera Ismail Khan District. The main village of the frontier region is Darazinda, which borders South Waziristan.

Geography and climate
The geography of Frontier Region Dera Ismail Khan is mostly hilly as it lies near Sulaiman Range. The Sherani Area is totally under the eastern shadow of highest peak of Takht-e-sulaiman. The northern side is bounded by Gomal pass.

The climate of Frontier Region Dera Ismail Khan from December to February is cold, and from May to September is warm. Kulachi is the most historical tehsil of Dera Ismail Khan.

Demography

The first language of 97.6% of the population is Pashto.

Education
According to the Alif Ailaan Pakistan District Education Rankings 2015, FR Dera Ismail Khan is ranked 127 out of 148 districts in terms of education. For facilities and infrastructure, the district is ranked 95 out of 148.

See also

Federally Administered Tribal Areas
Dera Ismail Khan District

References

External links

Constitutional Provisions on the Tribal Areas - Chapter 3, Part XII of the Constitution of Pakistan
Government of the Federally Administered Tribal Areas
Pakistani Federal Ministry of States and Frontier Regions

Durand Line
Frontier Regions
Frontier